The glossary of Arabic toponyms gives translations of Arabic terms commonly found as components in Arabic toponyms. A significant number of them were put together during the PEF Survey of Palestine carried out in the second half of the 19th century.

A

B

D

H

I

J

K

M

N

O

Q

R

U

W

See also
Oikonyms in Western and South Asia
Place names of Palestine

References

Sources

External links
The intro to a 1950s gazeteer for 35,000 placenames of Arabian Peninsula and surrounding waters and islands  contains a glossary of generic toponymic features 

Toponymy
Geography-related lists
Arabic toponyms
Arabic toponyms

Arabic language
Wikipedia glossaries using description lists